Leah Croucher was a British teenager reported missing on 15 February 2019 in Milton Keynes, Buckinghamshire, England. 

Croucher disappeared on her morning walk to work from Emerson Valley to Knowlhill. In October 2022, human remains were found in a property in Furzton; they were later confirmed to be those of Croucher.

The prime suspect in Croucher's death, a convicted sex offender, hanged himself two months after the disappearance.

Disappearance
At approximately 08:00 GMT on 15 February 2019, 19-year-old Leah Croucher left her home on Quantock Crescent in the Emerson Valley area of Milton Keynes, Buckinghamshire to begin her  walk to her work at a direct debit collection agency in Knowlhill. She did not arrive for her 09:00 shift and was reported missing by her parents later that evening, after not returning home from work.

Croucher was last seen on CCTV at 08:16 on Buzzacott Lane in Furzton, walking in the direction of her work. Someone matching her description was seen nearby at about 08:20. Croucher's phone left the mobile network at about 08:34 and did not rejoin a network.

Three separate witnesses reported seeing someone matching her description, between 09:30 and 11:15, walking near Furzton Lake. The witnesses said that she looked visibly upset and crying while talking on the phone. Police have not confirmed if these sightings were that of Croucher.

She was last seen dressed in a black coat, skinny black jeans and black Converse high top shoes and was carrying a small black rucksack.

Police investigation 
In a public appeal for information to help find the missing girl, TVP released CCTV footage of Croucher. On 18 February, the police began searching Furzton Lake for evidence and continued the search for a number of days. They also searched Blue Lagoon Local Nature Reserve in Water Eaton, after a report of clothing matching Croucher's.

TVP said that its officers visited more than 4,000 homes and that it deployed specialist search teams, drones and helicopters. They also used marine units and dive teams during searches of lakes across Milton Keynes. Nothing was recovered during any search.

On the anniversary of her disappearance, an initial reward was doubled to £10,000. Appeals for information were made in Yorkshire and Lancashire.

Murder enquiry
They announced that they were conducting a murder enquiry, although formal identification of the remains had yet to be completed. On 14 October, a police spokesperson identified a convicted sex offender, Neil Maxwell, as their prime suspect as he was the only person with access to the Loxbeare Drive house at the time. In April 2019, two months after Croucher's disappearance, Maxwell hanged himself at a block of flats near the town's Campbell Park.

On 21 October, the remains found at Loxbeare Drive were formally confirmed to be those of Croucher.

Media 
 An episode of Crimewatch Live which aired in September 2019 detailed Crouchers's story. The programme featured interviews with Croucher's mother as well as showing CCTV footage of her final sighting.

 This Morning on ITV asked investigator Mark Williams-Thomas to take a closer look at the story in October 2019.

See also
List of solved missing person cases
List of unsolved deaths
United Kingdom missing people charity

References

External links 
Finding Leah website created by the community led investigation
Police site for Leah Croucher by the Thames Valley Police

1999 births
2010s missing person cases
2019 crimes in the United Kingdom
Crime in Buckinghamshire
Deaths by person in England
February 2019 crimes in Europe
February 2019 events in the United Kingdom
Formerly missing people
Milton Keynes
Missing person cases in England
Unsolved deaths in England